The Black Hills Gold was an American professional basketball club based in Rapid City, South Dakota that competed in the International Basketball Association for a single season (1999/2000).  The team followed two previous Rapid City IBA teams, the Black Hills Posse, which played from 1995 through 1998, and the Rapid City Thrillers, which played in the 1998/1999 season.  In 2000 the team moved to Mitchell, South Dakota and played for one season as the South Dakota Gold, then folded.

External links

Defunct basketball teams in the United States
Basketball teams in South Dakota
Defunct sports teams in South Dakota
Basketball teams established in 1999
Basketball teams disestablished in 2000
1999 establishments in South Dakota
2000 disestablishments in South Dakota